SS Arosa Kulm was a passenger ship which was launched at Hog Island, Pennsylvania in 1919 and completed in 1920.
In 1940 the ship was transferred to a Belgian shipping company as Ville d'Anvers together with seven other idle American ships and was the only one of the eight ships to survive World War II to re-enter passenger service in 1946 with 200 berths as City of Athens. In 1947 as Protea and refitted with berths for over 965 persons.  the accommodations were probably the worst of any ship of that time. In 1952 the accommodations were adjusted to 900 and she was renamed Arosa Kulm after being sold to Panama's Arosa Line.

Australia was visited four times by Arosa Kulm.

In addition to serving immigrants, Arosa Kulm was chartered by American Field Service, an exchange organization bringing numerous exchange students between Europe and the U.S.

Arosa Kulm was scrapped at Bruges in Belgium in 1959.

See also 
 Arosa Sky alias Bianca C.
 Arosa Star

References

External links 
   Life onboard Arosa Kulm
  Cruising the past. The Arosa Line  – Immigrants and Students
   Several photos of Arosa Kulm
  Photo of Arosa Kulm
  Overseas Liner AROSA KULM in Bremerhaven 1956

1919 ships
Ocean liners